Ingram is an English masculine given name, from the Anglo-French (Norman) Enguerran (ultimately Frankish Angilram).
Notable people with the name include:
 Ingram Cecil Connor III (Gram Parsons) (d.1973), Country Musician
 Ingram, bishop of Glasgow (d. 1174)
 Ingram de Umfraville (fl. 1284–1320), Guardian of Scotland during the Wars of Scottish Independence
 Ingram de Ketenis (died 1407 or 1408), Scottish cleric.
 Ingram Lindsay (died 1458), Bishop of Aberdeen.
Ingram Bywater, (1840–1914), English classical scholar
Ingram Crockett (1856–1936), American poet and journalist
Ingram Frizer (died 1627), murderer of playwright Christopher Marlowe
Ingram Macklin Stainback (1883–1961), the ninth Territorial Governor of Hawaiʻi
Ingram Marshall (born 1942), American composer
Ingram Olkin (born 1924), professor emeritus and chair of statistics and education at Stanford University
Ingram Wilcox, British winner of Who Wants to Be a Millionaire?

Masculine given names

de:Ingram_(Name)#Vorname